Lydia Sherman (December 24, 1824 – May 16, 1878), née Danbury, also known as The Derby Poisoner, was an American serial killer. She poisoned eight children in her care (six of which were her own) and her three husbands and was convicted of second-degree murder in 1872. Five years into her sentence, she escaped under the pretext of being sick and got a job as housekeeper to a rich widower in Providence. She was caught and imprisoned again before dying in Wethersfield State Prison on May 16, 1878 from cancer.

Life and crimes
Lydia Danbury was orphaned as a child and raised by her uncle, the farmer John Claygay. At age 16, she worked as a tailor and met her first husband, Edward Struck, at age 17 through the Methodist church. They moved to New York City. After her husband became depressed after losing work, Lydia Struck poisoned him with arsenic in 1864. Six weeks later, she poisoned three of her young children in the same manner and two more children in 1865. Their death certificates listed "typhoid fever" as the cause of death.

Meanwhile, Lydia Struck worked as a nurse and married her second husband, the widower Dennis Hurlburt, in 1868. After noticing her husband's declining health, she poisoned him with arsenic. She married Horatio Sherman in 1870 and killed him in May 1871.

See also
 List of serial killers in the United States

Notes and references

1824 births
1878 deaths
19th-century American criminals
19th-century American women
American female serial killers
American murderers of children
Criminals from New Jersey
Filicides in New York (state)
Mariticides
People from Burlington, New Jersey
Place of death missing
Poisoners
Serial killers who died in prison custody